Andrew Jonathan Penn (born 27 July 1974) is a New Zealand cricketer who played five One Day Internationals for New Zealand between 1997 and 2001. He played first-class cricket for Central Districts and Wellington from 1995 to 2003.

Penn made three overseas tours with New Zealand. This is the record for the most tours with a Test-playing team in a complete career without ever playing in a Test. Penn has also played for Wanganui in the Hawke Cup.

Penn works as a solicitor in property and commercial law. He is a principal at Whanganui law firm Treadwell Gordon.

References

External links
 

1974 births
Living people
New Zealand cricketers
Cricketers from Whanganui
New Zealand One Day International cricketers
Central Districts cricketers
Wellington cricketers
North Island cricketers
21st-century New Zealand lawyers